The 2022 4 Hours of Monza was an endurance sportscar racing event that was held on 3 July 2022, as the third round of the 2022 European Le Mans Series.

In LMP2, the race was won by the #28 IDEC Sport run Oreca 07-Gibson, driven by Paul Lafargue, Paul-Loup Chatin and Patrick Pilet.

In LMP3, the race was won by the #13 Inter Europol Competition run Ligier JS P320, driven by Nico Pino, Charles Crews and Guilherme Oliveira.

In LMGTE, the race was won by the #60 Iron Lynx run Ferrari 488 GTE Evo, driven by Claudio Schiavoni, Matteo Cressoni and Davide Rigon.

Qualifying

Qualifying Result 
Pole position in each class are marked in bold.

Race

Race Result 
Class winners are marked in bold. - Cars failing to complete 70% of the winner's distance are marked as Not Classified (NC).

References 

Monza
4 Hours
Monza